CCPA may refer to:

 Science and health

CCPA (biochemistry), a specific receptor agonist in biochemistry
Catabolite Control Protein A (CcpA), a master regulator of carbon metabolism in gram-positive bacteria
Childhood Cancer Parents Alliance, a UK cancer charity

 Politics

California Consumer Privacy Act, legislation that seeks to protect the data privacy of technology users
Canadian Centre for Policy Alternatives, a progressive policy research institute in Canada
Consumer Credit Protection Act of 1968, a United States federal wage garnishment law
United States Court of Customs and Patent Appeals (1909–1982), a former United States federal court

 Education and culture

Chicago College of Performing Arts, a performing arts college at Roosevelt University, Chicago, Illinois
Chinese Catholic Patriotic Association, the state-sponsored Catholic Church of China
Coliseum College Prep Academy, a grade 6–12 public school in Oakland, California
Covina Center for the Performing Arts, a theatre in Covina, California